Al-Sanatin and al-Ghail is a sub-district located in Khamir District, 'Amran Governorate, Yemen. Al-Sanatin and al-Ghail had a population of 9212 according to the 2004 census.

References 

Sub-districts in Khamir District